Nitidula flavomaculata is a species of sap-feeding beetle in the family Nitidulidae. It is native to the Mediterranean Region and naturalized in North America. It is associated with later stages of decay in mammalian corpses.  It can be used in forensic investigations.

References

Further reading

 

Nitidulidae
Beetles of North Africa
Beetles of Asia
Beetles of Europe
Beetles of North America
Beetles described in 1790
Taxa named by Pietro Rossi
Articles created by Qbugbot